The Renfe Class 321 (formerly 2100 series) is a class of diesel-electric locomotives operated by Renfe in Spain, designed by Alco and built by them and by Euskalduna under licence.

Technical specifications
The locomotives have a Co-Co wheel arrangement, and are equipped with GEC 5G-761 engines.

History
Production started in 1965. A total of 80 locomotives were built until 1971, with the first eight built by Alco, and the remaining 72 by Euskalduna. Four locomotives were rebuilt for  freight service trials.

Regular services with Renfe have ended, and some locomotives are used by Adif to haul maintenance trains.

References

Further reading
 

321
Diesel locomotives of Spain
ALCO locomotives
Co-Co locomotives
Co'Co' Diesel Locomotives of Europe